Bernt Lund (July 14, 1812 – October 30, 1885) was a 19th-century Norwegian landscape artist, author and military officer.

Biography
Lund was born in Våler in Hedmark, Norway. He took military officer exam in 1837 and spent his career in the Norwegian Army advancing to Captain in 1863. However, he later resigned to dedicate himself to engineering.
 
He also trained as an artist. He attended art school with landscape painter Thomas Fearnley (1839-1840). He studied  landscape art under the influence of Hans Gude in Düsseldorf (1844-1845). Besides painting, Lund was also active as a writer. He published a book of poetry in 1882. He especially became known as the author the poem Trysil-Knud (1861), which was used as an inspiration for the 1942 Norwegian film Trysil-Knut. His work is also featured in Christian Tønsberg's illustrated volume Norge fremstillet i Tegninger (Norway Presented in Drawings, 1846–1848).

From 1853 to 1878, Lund was employed by the Norwegian Public Roads Administration.

Personal life
In 1847, he married the painter Hedevig Erichsen. He died in Christiania (now Oslo).

Gallery

References

People from Våler, Norway
Norwegian Army personnel
19th-century Norwegian painters
1812 births
1885 deaths
19th-century Norwegian poets
Norwegian landscape painters
Norwegian male poets
19th-century Norwegian male writers
Norwegian male painters
19th-century Norwegian male artists